Lean on Him is an album by American saxophonist Buddy Terry released on the Mainstream label in 1973.

Track listing
All compositions by Buddy Terry except as indicated
 "Lean on Me (Lean on Him)" (Bill Withers) – 5:46
 "Holy, Holy, Holy" (Traditional) – 5:29
 "Climbing Higher Mountains" (Traditional) – 3:07
 "Amazing Grace" (Traditional) – 4:42
 "Inner Peace" – 10:14
 "Precious Lord, Take My Hand" (Thomas A. Dorsey) – 5:36
 "Love Offering" – 7:24

Personnel
Buddy Terry – tenor saxophone, soprano saxophone, flute, arranger
Eddie Henderson – trumpet, flugelhorn
Jay Berliner – electric guitar
Larry Willis – piano, electric piano
Ernie Hayes – organ
Wilbur Bascomb – electric bass
Bernard Purdie – drums
Lawrence Killian – percussion
Alphonse Mouzon, Dee Dee Bridgewater – vocals

References

Mainstream Records albums
Buddy Terry albums
1973 albums
Albums produced by Bob Shad